Taza is a city in Morocco.

Taza may also refer to:
Taza (crater), on Mars
Taza (Iraq), a town in Iraq
Taza (Lydia), a town of ancient Lydia, now in Turkey
Taza (film), 1954 American western a/k/a Taza, Son of Cochise
Taza (Chiricahua leader), an Apache leader
Taza National Park, in Algeria